Kris Kany is a former American rugby union player. She was a member of the  squad that won the inaugural 1991 Women's Rugby World Cup in Wales. She also featured at the 1994 Rugby World Cup in Scotland.

Kany and the 1991 World Cup squad were inducted into the United States Rugby Hall of Fame in 2017.

References 

Year of birth missing (living people)
Living people
Female rugby union players
American female rugby union players
United States women's international rugby union players